Ali Kadhim Nassir Al-Tameemi ,  1 January 1949 – 2 January 2018) was an Iraqi football striker who played for Iraq in the 1972 AFC Asian Cup & 1976 AFC Asian Cup. He also played for Al Zawraa. He held Iraq's goal record with 35 goals in his time, until Hussein Saeed broke it in 1982. He's the uncle of Iraqi international footballer Ali Adnan Kadhim.

After a long illness, Kadhim died right after his 69th birthday.

Career statistics

International goals
Scores and results list Iraq's goal tally first.

References

External links
https://twitter.com/hassaninmubarak
https://web.archive.org/web/20120425131808/http://www.palmoon.net/7/topic-4154-8.html
http://forum.kooora.com/f.aspx?t=28582596

1949 births
2018 deaths
Iraqi footballers
Iraq international footballers
1972 AFC Asian Cup players
1976 AFC Asian Cup players
Olympic footballers of Iraq
Footballers at the 1980 Summer Olympics
Al-Shorta SC players
Al-Zawraa SC managers
Association football forwards
Footballers at the 1974 Asian Games
Iraqi football managers
Asian Games competitors for Iraq